Thomas Howes may refer to:

 Thomas George Bond Howes (1853–1905), English malacologist
 Thomas Howes (hostage) (born 1953), American Northrop Grumman employee; former hostage of Revolutionary Armed Forces of Colombia (FARC)
 Thomas Howes (actor) (born 1986), English actor and musician

See also 
 Tommy Howe (1892–1957), English footballer
 Thomas Howe (disambiguation)